Anondo Osru (English: Tears of Happiness) is a 1997 Bangladeshi film starring Salman Shah, Shabnur and Kanchi in main roles.

Cast 
 Salman Shah
 Shabnur
 Kanchi
 Dolly Zohur
 Humayun Faridi
 Nana Shah

Story
Salman Shah plays a left-home lyricist, who writes sad songs. He goes to a village, falls in love with a simple girl, Nuri (Shabnur). Society doesn't appreciate this uneven love.

Music
The film's music and lyrics were composed by Ahmed Imtiaz Bulbul.

References

External links
 

Bengali-language Bangladeshi films
Films scored by Ahmed Imtiaz Bulbul
1997 films
1990s Bengali-language films